Pregnenolone succinate (brand names Panzalone, Formula 405; also known as pregnenolone hemisuccinate or pregn-5-en-3β-ol-20-one 3β-(hydrogen succinate)) is a synthetic pregnane steroid and an ester of pregnenolone which is described as a glucocorticoid and anti-inflammatory drug and has been patented and marketed as a topical medication in the form of a cream for the treatment of allergic, pruritic, and inflammatory dermatitis. It has also been described as a non-hormonal sterol, having neurosteroid activity, and forming a progesterone analogue via dehydrogenation.

In addition to its glucocorticoid effects, pregnenolone succinate has been found to act as a negative allosteric modulator of the GABAA receptor and a positive allosteric modulator of the NMDA receptor similarly to pregnenolone sulfate.

See also
 Pregnenolone acetate
 Prebediolone acetate

References

Abandoned drugs
Steroid esters
GABAA receptor negative allosteric modulators
Glucocorticoids
Ketones
Neurosteroids
NMDA receptor agonists
Pregnanes
Prodrugs
Succinate esters